Lake Poinsett is a census-designated place (CDP) in Hamlin and Brookings counties in South Dakota, United States. The population was 501 at the 2020 census.

Geography
The Lake Poinsett CDP comprises the lake of the same name and its shoreside communities in Hamlin and Brookings counties. U.S. Route 81 passes through the CDP along the western shore of the lake and leads north  to Watertown and south  to Arlington.

Demographics

References

Census-designated places in Hamlin County, South Dakota
Census-designated places in Brookings County, South Dakota
Census-designated places in South Dakota